Photocopier is a 2021 Indonesian crime mystery drama film, co-written and directed by Wregas Bhanuteja in his feature-length directorial debut.

The film had its world premiere at the 26th Busan International Film Festival in October 2021, in the New Currents competition. The film won a total of twelve Citra Awards out of seventeen nominations, including the awards for Best Picture and Best Director. It won the most Citra Awards by a single film.

Plot

Suryani (Sur) is a college student enrolled in a computer studies course, who is also part of her campus's theater group, Mata Hari. Sur designed a website for the group, which has helped to promote their image. When Mata Hari’s performance of “Medusa” is accepted for a festival in Kyoto, Sur joins a celebratory party with the other group members at leader Rama Soemarno's house.  An older girl, Farah, advises Sur not to go to the party, and Sur’s strict father also warns her beforehand not to drink alcohol, but Sur ignores their advice. 

The next day, Sur wakes up late and hungover, with few memories of the night before. At a meeting with her campus board to decide the question of her scholarship, she learns that selfies of herself whilst drunk have been posted online, although Sur cannot remember doing this. The board revokes her scholarship and, in addition, her angry father kicks her out of the family home, after telling her she did not come home until 3.00 am, carried by a man who woke the whole street up in the process.

Sur questions the other members of Mata Hari, trying to find out what happened to her the night before. One member, Anggun, admits to ordering a taxi for her at around 10 pm. Remembering that Tariq had given her a whiskey shot, Sur is convinced that she was drugged and decides to investigate. 

Sur moves in with her friend Amin, who runs a photocopy business, and on the side illegally sells theses to students. When members of Mata Hari visit Amin’s business to print out copies of coursework, etc, from their phones, Sur, hiding upstairs, hacks into those phones from her laptop and downloads the data. 

With Anggun, Sur goes to the taxi company, to find out why her journey home from the party took an inordinately long time. The driver, Burhan, explains that he had to stop to change a flat tyre. 

Sur confronts the theatre group with photos and videos from the party, which suggest that Tariq drugged her. He protests his innocence and the whole group go to Rama’s house, to view his extensive video coverage of the party. The videos exonerate Tariq, and do not show anyone tampering with Sur’s phone while she was wasted, so the group assume she was responsible for posting the selfies of herself while drunk. 

Sur noticed from Rama’s videos that she did not have more than four drinks at the party. With Amin, she carries out a “drinking experiment” to test whether four alcoholic drinks really is enough to make her pass out, but finds she can drink much more; this reinforces her conviction that she was drugged. 

Sur analyses samples of Rama's installation art, which is supposedly photos of the Milky Way, but she notices similarities between the patterns and birthmarks on her back. Tampering with Rama’s Milky Way photos, she discovers they are actually photos of blemishes on human skin, photoshopped to look like a galaxy. She asks Amin to persuade Rama to visit the photocopy shop, so she can download files from his phone. But during Rama’s visit she overhears a conversation between him and Amin, which hint at some secret business between them. She challenges Amin, who confesses that he downloaded private pictures from students’ phones for Rama, who needed the photos “for inspiration”. Amin says he only did it to pay for his sister’s medical bills, but Sur leaves in disgust. 

Sur presents her evidence to the Ethics Board at the campus, but both the evidence, and her identity, are leaked and go viral. Rama’s lawyer demands that Sur make a public apology on video and, urged by the college board and her parents - none of whom are prepared to take her side - she reluctantly agrees. However her mother Yati learns the truth after recognising pictures of her daughter’s birthmarks, and Sur tells her everything. Yati arranges for Sur to take shelter at the home of an acquaintance, Siti, who has medical knowledge. Siti tells Sur it is too late now to prove that she was drugged.

Farah and Tariq visit Sur and admit that they were also drugged by Rama and that pictures of their bodies appear in Rama’s installation art. Like Sur, Farah was given a ride home in Burhan’s taxi. Sur learns that Burhan's address is some distance from Rama's house, suggesting that her taxi ride home from the party was pre-arranged, and the reason it took so long was because Burhan stopped to take photographs of her body. 

Tariq arranges a taxi ride with Burhan, having first “fixed” one of his tyres, causing a flat en route. It becomes obvious that Burhan does not have the physical strength to change a tyre, despite his having claimed to have done so during Sur’s taxi ride. Tariq knocks Burhan out and gets his phone, which contains videos of Rama's sexual abuse of eight people, including Sur, Farah and Tariq. Later, at Siti’s house, they debate what to do with this evidence, while Burhan recovers in another room. 

Rama has hired fixers, disguised as some of the fumigation sprayers currently operating in the city to control an outbreak of mosquitoes, and they overpower everyone at the house, including Burhan; Rama then enters, dressed as Perseus and singing his dialogue from “Medusa”, symbolically saying that no one will believe their allegations, before burning Burhan's phone. He calls Farah and Tariq “Gorgons” and Sur “Medusa”, synonymous to demonic. Rama and his thugs then leave, while the others recover from the effects of the fumes. 

The next day, Sur and Farah take Amin's photocopier to the campus's roof, where they print and distribute all the remaining evidence they have of Rama’s guilt. Gradually, other victims arrive, with their own evidence to print. Retrieving the papers, Anggun punches Rama. Sur, Farah, and Tariq then print scans of their faces.

Cast
Shenina Syawalita Cinnamon as Suryani (Sur)
Chicco Kurniawan as Amin
Lutesha as Farah
Jerome Kurnia as Tariq
Dea Panendra as Anggun
Giulio Parengkuan as Rama
Lukman Sardi as Sur's father
Ruth Marini as Sur's mother
Yayan Ruhian as Rama's father
Landung Simatupang as Burhan
Rukman Rosadi as Sur's college dean
Mian Tiara as Siti

Production
The production of Photocopier took place for twenty days in Jakarta during the COVID-19 pandemic and followed local COVID-19 safety protocols.

Through Photocopier, Bhanuteja strived to give a depiction of a victim of sexual assaults, also spread awareness regarding to the topic. Previously, Bhanuteja along with his team, had researched about the topic for a year, including initiating conversations with the victims of sexual assaults. They also started discussions with some anti-rape activists, including actress Hannah Al Rashid, who was involved in the film's screenwriting.

Release
Photocopier had its world premiere at the 26th Busan International Film Festival in October 2021, in the New Currents competition. Netflix acquired the film's distribution rights, releasing it on January 13, 2022.

Accolades

References

Notes

External links
 
 

2021 films
2021 crime drama films
2021 drama films
2021 directorial debut films
Indonesian drama films
Films about sexual harassment
Films shot in Indonesia
Indonesian-language Netflix original films
2020s Indonesian-language films